Agog! Press was  an independent  Australian book publisher, specializing in speculative fiction short story collections.  Founded in 2002 by Cat Sparks,  the press published nine anthologies of speculative fiction.

In 2006 Agog!  Press forged a collaboration with United States  publisher Prime Books, which has led to international (US) distribution of Agog! titles in both hard and soft cover.

Titles
Agog! Ripping Reads (2006), ed. Cat Sparks, 
Daikaiju! Giant Monster Tales (2005), ed. Rob Hood and Robin Pen, 
Daikaiju!2: Revenge of the Giant Monsters (2007), ed. Rob Hood and Robin Pen, 
Daikaiju!3: Giant Monsters vs the World (2007), ed. Rob Hood and Robin Pen, 
Agog! Smashing Stories (2004), ed. Cat Sparks, 
Agog! Terrific Tales (2003), ed. Cat Sparks, 
Agog! Fantastic Fiction (2002), ed. Cat Sparks, 
AustrAlien Absurdities (2002), ed. Chuck McKenzie and Tansy Rayner Roberts
Scary Food: A Compendium of Gastronomic Atrocity (2008) ed. Cat Sparks, . A charity anthology to raise money for the treatment of Paul Haines (fiction writer), who had been diagnosed with cancer. All authors donated their stories.

External links
Cat Sparks' website

Book publishing companies of Australia